Hans-Georg Backhaus (born 1929) is a German Marxian economist and philosopher. He is considered one of the most important theorists on the field of Marx's theory of value. He began a long-term cooperation with Helmut Reichelt already from his years of university studies.

Selected publications

Main work
 Backhaus, Hans-Georg: Dialektik der Wertform. Untersuchungen zur Marxschen Ökonomiekritik. Freiburg i. Br. 1997.

Further publications
  
 Backhaus, Hans-Georg: Über den Doppelsinn der Begriffe „Politische Ökonomie“ und „Kritik“ bei Marx und in der Frankfurter Schule. In: Wolfgang Harich zum Gedächtnis. Eine Gedenkschrift in zwei Bänden. Hrsg. von Stefan Dornuf und Reinhard Pitsch. Bd. 2. München 2000, S. 12-213.

Bibliography
 Eldred, Michael Critique of competitive freedom and the bourgeois-democratic state Copenhagen: Kurasje, 1984 .
 Bonefeld, Werner: Dialektik der Wertform: Untersuchungen zur marxschen Okonomiekritik (The Dialectic of the Value Form: Investigations into Marx's Critique of Economics).
 Bonefeld, Werner: Kapital and its subtitle: A note on the meaning of critique.
 Kubota, Ken: Die dialektische Darstellung des allgemeinen Begriffs des Kapitals im Lichte der Philosophie Hegels. Zur logischen Analyse der politischen Ökonomie unter besonderer Berücksichtigung Adornos und der Forschungsergebnisse von Rubin, Backhaus, Reichelt, Uno und Sekine (PDF), in: Beiträge zur Marx-Engels-Forschung. Neue Folge 2009, pp. 199-224. .
 Kubota, Ken: The Dialectical Presentation of the General Notion of Capital in the Light of Hegel's Philosophy: On the Logical Analysis of Political Economy with Special Consideration of Adorno and the Research Results of Rubin, Backhaus, Reichelt, Uno, and Sekine (PDF), in: Revista Dialectus 9 (2020), no. 18, pp. 39-65. .

External links
 Verified, continuously updated selected bibliography with links and materials.

German economists
20th-century German philosophers
German Marxists
Marxist theorists
Living people
1929 births
German male writers
Marxian critique of political economy
Critics of political economy
21st-century German philosophers